Labyrinth is a 2013 artwork by the British artist Mark Wallinger which marks the 150th anniversary of the London Underground. 

The artwork consists of 270 enamel plaques of unique unicursal labyrinth designs, one for every station on the Underground at the time of the installation in 2013. Although the individual shape of each labyrinth is unique, the design language of the labyrinths is identical (black on a white square of vitreous enamel, with a red cross).  Each is numbered according to its order in the route taken by the contestants in the 2009 Guinness World Record Tube Challenge. Each labyrinth is located in a publicly accessible part of the station, such as a ticket hall, platforms or waiting room. 

The permanent artwork was commissioned by Art on the Underground, the contemporary art programme of Transport for London (TfL), as part of the 150th anniversary of London Underground. The artworks were manufactured by the same company that builds London Underground's signage. The first works were unveiled at stations in February 2013, with all 270 installed by the end of 2013.

As part of the 150th anniversary celebrations, Art on the Underground worked with the Royal College of Art and Mark Wallinger to create artistic workshops and events for young people, TfL staff and passengers - based around the Labyrinths.

In October 2014, Art/Books published Labyrinth: A Journey Through London's Underground by Mark Wallinger, a comprehensive photographic book of all 270 labyrinth designs in situ in the Underground stations.

Bibliography

External links 

 Art on the Underground - Labyrinth

References

2013 in art
Mazes
London Underground